Pastura is a small unincorporated community and census-designated place (CDP) in Guadalupe County, New Mexico, United States, approximately halfway between Santa Rosa and Vaughn. As of the 2010 census it had a population of 23.

History
It was established in 1901 as a watering spot for steam trains on the Southern Pacific Railroad. In 1903 the US Postal Service built a post office in Pastura in response to its growth, and in 1907, the Southern Pacific Railroad built a  wooden pipeline from the Sierra Blanca mountain range to Pastura.

The small town began to decline when it was bypassed by Route 66, which passed  to the north. When the steam locomotives were replaced by diesel locomotives in the 1940s, the railroad no longer needed to use Pastura as a watering stop, and the town declined even further. Today the area is a small farming community.

The Chicano author Rudolfo Anaya was born in Pastura in 1937.

Geography

Demographics

Education
Vaughn Municipal Schools is the local school district.

References

Census-designated places in Guadalupe County, New Mexico
Census-designated places in New Mexico